Kufeirit  is a Palestinian village in the West Bank, located 16 km west of the city of Jenin in the northern West Bank. According to the Palestinian Central Bureau of Statistics, the town had a population of  2,446  inhabitants in mid-year 2006.

History
Pottery sherds from the Iron Age II, Persian, Hellenistic, early and late Roman, Byzantine, early Muslim and the Medieval eras have been found here.

Ottoman era
Kufeirit, like the rest of Palestine, was incorporated into the Ottoman Empire in 1517, and in the  census of 1596 it was a part of the nahiya ("subdistrict") of  Jabal Sami which was under the administration of the liwa ("district") of  Nablus.  The village had a population of 29 households and 4 bachelors, all Muslim. The villagers  paid a fixed tax-rate of 33,3%, on  wheat, barley, summer crops, olive trees,  beehives and/or goats, in addition to occasional revenues and  a customary tax for people of Nablus area; a total of 10,000  akçe.

In 1838  the village (called Kufeireh) was noted as part of the esh–Sha'rawiyeh esh–Shurkiyeh ("the Eastern") District, north of Nablus.

In 1870, Victor Guérin noted the village on his travels in the region, as being less significant than neighbouring Ya'bad.

In 1882, the PEF's Survey of Western Palestine (SWP)  described  Kefreireh as: "a good sized village on a hill at the edge of the Plain of Arrabeh, with a well on the east and olives."

British mandate era
In the 1922 census of Palestine, conducted  by the British Mandate authorities, Kufairat had a population of 113 Muslims, increasing  in  the 1931 census to 154 Muslims in 28 houses.

In  the 1945 statistics,  the population of Kufeirat was 240  Muslims, with 732 dunams of land, according to an official land and population survey.  Of this, 241 dunams were used for plantations and irrigable land, 200 dunams for cereals, while 6 dunams were built-up (urban) land.

Jordanian era
In the wake of the 1948 Arab–Israeli War, and after the 1949 Armistice Agreements, Kufeirit came  under Jordanian rule.

In 1961, the population was  457 persons.

Post 1967
Since the Six-Day War in 1967, Kufeirit  has been under Israeli occupation. The population of Kufeirat in the 1967 census conducted by  Israel was 583, of whom 109  originated from the Israeli territory.

References

Bibliography

External links
Welcome To Kufeirat
Survey of Western Palestine, Map 8: IAA, Wikimedia commons 

Villages in the West Bank
Jenin Governorate
Municipalities of the State of Palestine